Furcodontichthys novaesi is the only species of the monotypic genus Furcodontichthys, a genus of  armored catfish.

This species is endemic to Brazil where it is known from the middle Amazon at Lake Tefé and from the upper Juruá River drainage in the Solimões River basin. F. novaesi inhabits sandy substrates.

F. novaesi reaches a length of  SL. As with closely related genera, males of Furcodontichthys show a hypertrophied development of the lips suggesting that this genus is a lip brooder. The presence of conspicuous fringed barbels at the lip corners
is unique among the Loricariinae subfamily.

References

Loricariini
Taxa named by Lúcia Helena Rapp Py-Daniel
Fish described in 1981
Fish of South America
Fish of Brazil
Fish of the Amazon basin
Endemic fauna of Brazil